Al-'Ulmaniyya was a Palestinian Arab village in the Safad Subdistrict. It was depopulated during the 1947–1948 Civil War in Mandatory Palestine on April 20, 1948, by the Palmach's First Battalion of Operation Yiftach. It was located 14.5 km northeast of Safad.

History
In 1596 it appeared in the Ottoman  tax registers, as being in the nahiyah ("subdistrict") of Jira, part of the   Liwa  ("district") of Safad.  It had a population of 8 Households and 2 bachelors; an estimated 55 persons, all Muslim. They paid a fixed tax-rate of 25% on agricultural products, including wheat, barley, vegetable and fruit garden, orchards,  goats and beehives, in addition to occasional revenues and water buffaloes; a total of 2,559 Akçe. All of the revenue went to a Waqf.

In 1881, the PEF's Survey of Western Palestine noted at Kh. Almaniyeh: "A few cattle-sheds and traces of ruins."

British Mandate era
In the 1922 census of Palestine conducted by the British Mandate authorities,  'Almaniyeh  had a population of 122 Muslims,   increasing in the 1931 census, when it was counted together with Zubeid, to 432; 5 Christians and 427  Muslims,  in  a total of 100  houses.

In the 1945 statistics the village had a population of 260 Muslims with 1,169 dunams of land.
Of this,  1,135 dunams were used for cereals, while the  built-up areas of the village amounted to 9 dunams.

1948, aftermath
Al-'Ulmaniyya became depopulated on April 20, 1948, after a military assault by Yishuv forces.

Yesud ha-Ma’ala  is 2.5 km southeast of the village site.

In 1992 the village site was described:  "The site is thickly wooded with eucalyptus trees, making it difficult to discern any remains of the village. Work is proceeding on street construction for Lake al-Hula's nature preservation area. Some of the surrounding lands are cultivated, but most have either been made part of the preservation area or are marshland."

References

Bibliography

External links
Welcome To al-'Ulmaniyya
al-'Ulmaniyya, Zochrot
al-‘Ulmaniyya
Survey of Western Palestine, Map 4: IAA, Wikimedia commons

Arab villages depopulated during the 1948 Arab–Israeli War
District of Safad